Rug or RUG may refer to:
 Rug, or carpet, a textile floor covering
 Rug, slang for a toupée
 Ghent University (Rijksunversiteit Gent, or RUG)
 Really Useful Group, or RUG, a company set up by Andrew Lloyd Webber
 Rugby railway station, National Rail code RUG 
 University of Groningen (Rijksuniversiteit Groningen), or RUG